Jinaan Hussain is a Pakistani actress, model, singer and painter. She made her acting debut with theatre and moved on to television. Her debut series on television was Aisay Jiya Jaley (2013) aired on Hum TV. She rose to fame with Bashar Momin and subsequently played the lead roles in several television series including Baba Jani and Rabba Mainu Maaf Kareen and Koji.

Early life
Hussain was born in Abbottabad, Khyber Pakhtunkhwa, Pakistan. During her schooling, she obtained A+ in most of the standards and got first rank in various Naat and Debate competitions. She studied Fine Art and graduated from National College of Arts. Painting was her major subject.

Career
While studying, she started doing theatre and came to Karachi to do theatre plays. She joined the television industry in 2013 and played many lead roles in serials including Bashar Momin, Baba Jani and Mere Mohsin. She also did modeling for magazines, commercials and advertisements. She changed her name from Sundus Tariq to Jinaan Hussain due to health issues during her childhood.

Filmography

Television

Telefilm

Film

References

External links
 
 
 
 

1989 births
Living people
21st-century Pakistani women singers
Pakistani television actresses
21st-century Pakistani actresses
Pakistani film actresses
Pakistani women singers